Les Casquets or (The) Casquets is a group of rocks eight miles (13 km) northwest of Alderney in the Channel Islands; they are administered by the Bailiwick of Guernsey. The rocks are part of an underwater sandstone ridge. Other parts which emerge above the water are the islets of Burhou and Ortac. Little vegetation grows on them.

Origin of name
Theories as to the origin of the name include: 
derivation from the French "cascade", which alludes to the tidal surges which flow around them;
derivation from "casque", referring to the helmet-like shape of the rocks;
derivation from "cas" (broken) and "quet" (rock).

A map (Leyland map) dated from around 1640 gives a Latin name Casus Rupes (broken rocks), which would seem to confirm the third theory above, but which may be a folk etymology.

History

Wrecks
There have been numerous wrecks on the islets, many of them accounted for by fierce tides reaching 6–7 knots on springs, and a lack of landmarks in the area. The most famous wreck includes SS Stella, wrecked in 1899, with a loss of 105 lives. The largest wreck was the 8000-tonne water tanker Constantia S, lost in 1967.

It was believed for centuries that the loss of HMS Victory in 1744 was attributable to wrecking on the Casquets, the lightkeeper of Alderney even being court-martialled for failure to keep the light on at the time of the ship's loss.

World War II

The island was the location of a daring raid by a British commando unit on 2 September 1942. The raid was led by Major Gus March-Phillipps and was one of the first raids by Anders Lassen. In the raid the entire garrison of seven was captured and returned to England as prisoners and the radio and lighthouse wrecked.

In literature

Swinburne's Les Casquets
A. C. Swinburne's poem  Les Casquets is based on the Houguez family who actually lived on the island for 18 years. The Houguez were originally from Alderney, and the poem describes their life on Les Casquets. The daughter falls in love with a carpenter from Alderney but, moving to his island, finds life there too busy. She finds the "small bright streets of serene St Anne" and "the sight of the works of men" too much, and returns to Les Casquets.

Victor Hugo's L'Homme qui Rit
Victor Hugo, who lived on Guernsey, and who wrote much about the Channel Islands, says in his novel The Laughing Man (L'Homme qui Rit), published in 1869:

C. S. Forester's Hornblower and the Hotspur
In this tenth published, but third chronologically, of C. S. Forester's Horatio Hornblower series of novels, the titular hero of Hornblower and the Hotspur (published in 1962) is sent to reconnoitre the port of Brest in anticipation of war with France. The Casquets are mentioned as an area that should be negotiated carefully on the way there.

See also 
 Casquets lighthouses

References

External links
 Thumbnails of pictures of Les Casquets, John's CI Postcard Site, 2 March 2013. Retrieved 10 July 2020.
SS Stella website (requires JavaScript)
The  Alderney Museum Main Gallery – Geology. The Alderney Society

1724 establishments in Great Britain
Geography of Alderney
Horatio Hornblower
Victor Hugo
Shipwrecks in the English Channel
Uninhabited islands of the Bailiwick of Guernsey
World War II British Commando raids